San Donato di Lecce is a town and comune of 5,837 inhabitants  in the Italian province of Lecce in the Apulia region of south-east Italy. It includes the frazione of Galugnano.

References

Cities and towns in Apulia
Localities of Salento